Ibrahima Koné (born 16 June 1999) is a Malian professional footballer who plays as a forward for French club Lorient and the Mali national team.

Club career
In February 2018, Koné signed for Norwegian Eliteserien club FK Haugesund on a contract until 2021. On 10 January 2021, he was transferred to fellow Eliteserien club Sarpsborg 08. He signed a three-year contract with the club.

On 31 January 2022, Koné signed a 4.5-year contact with French Ligue 1 club Lorient.

International career
Koné made his debut for the Mali national team on 22 July 2017 against Gambia, scoring a hat-trick in a 4–0 win. His next appearance for Mali took place four years later, in a 1–0 2022 FIFA World Cup qualification win over Rwanda on 1 September 2021. On 12 January 2022, Koné scored the only goal in Mali's opening AFCON game against Tunisia, winning the game 1–0 with a penalty in the 48th minute. This particular game received international attention as referee Janny Sikazwe blew for full-time first in the 85th minute, then again in the 89th minute, creating great controversy as Tunisian coach Mondher Kebaier branded the referees actions "inexplicable".

Career statistics

Club

International

Scores and results list Mali's goal tally first, score column indicates score after each Koné goal.

References

External links
 

1999 births
Living people
Malian footballers
Association football forwards
Mali international footballers
Mali under-20 international footballers
2021 Africa Cup of Nations players
CO de Bamako players
FK Haugesund players
Adana Demirspor footballers
Sarpsborg 08 FF players
FC Lorient players
Eliteserien players
TFF First League players
Ligue 1 players
Malian expatriate footballers
Expatriate footballers in Norway
Malian expatriate sportspeople in Norway
Expatriate footballers in Turkey
Malian expatriate sportspeople in Turkey
Expatriate footballers in France
Malian expatriate sportspeople in France
21st-century Malian people